Brent North is a constituency represented in the House of Commons of the UK Parliament since 1997 by Barry Gardiner of the Labour Party.

History
Created in 1974 from the former seats of Wembley North and Wembley South, Brent North was a Conservative seat until 1997, held by Lancastrian former headmaster Rhodes Boyson with initially two fairly small 14% margins before the Conservative-dominated period beginning in 1979 which gave Boyson larger majorities until Labour won the seat in 1997. At the general elections of 1997 and 2001, Brent North produced the highest swing to Labour nationally. The winning candidate in 1997 was Glasgow-born Barry Gardiner, the youngest mayor of Cambridge in its history and former academic, who has held the seat ever since. The Liberal Democrats and their two predecessor parties (Liberal and SDP) amassed their largest share of the vote in 1974.  Labour's percentage majority almost halved at the 2005 general election from 30.1% to 15.8% and fell slightly to 15.4% in 2010, faced with a new Conservative challenger, Harshadbhai Patel. The Labour Party vote increased in both the 2015 and 2017 general elections and then dramatically decreased to a 15.8% margin in 2019.

Boundaries 

1974–1983: The London Borough of Brent wards of Barnhill, Fryent, Kenton, Kingsbury, Preston, Queensbury, Roe Green, St Andrew's, Sudbury, Sudbury Court, and Tokyngton.

1983–1997: The London Borough of Brent wards of Barnhill, Fryent, Kenton, Kingsbury, Preston, Queensbury, Roe Green, St Andrew's, Sudbury, and Sudbury Court.

1997–2010: The London Borough of Brent wards of Barnhill, Fryent, Kenton, Kingsbury, Preston, Queensbury, Roe Green, Sudbury, and Sudbury Court.

2010–present: The London Borough of Brent wards of Alperton, Barnhill, Fryent, Kenton, Northwick Park, Preston, Queensbury, Sudbury, and Wembley Central.

Most of the remaining wards in the London Borough of Brent are in the Brent Central constituency, with the exception of the wards of Brondesbury Park, Kilburn and Queens Park, which form part of the Hampstead and Kilburn seat.

Members of Parliament

Election results

Elections in the 2010s

Elections in the 2000s

Elections in the 1990s

Elections in the 1980s

Elections in the 1970s

See also 
 List of parliamentary constituencies in London

Notes

References

External links 
nomis Constituency Profile for Brent North — presenting data from the ONS annual population survey and other official statistics.

Politics Resources (Election results from 1922 onwards)
Electoral Calculus (Election results from 1955 onwards)

Parliamentary constituencies in London
Constituencies of the Parliament of the United Kingdom established in 1974
Politics of the London Borough of Brent